Jonathan Ott (born 1949 in Hartford, Connecticut) is an ethnobotanist, writer, translator, publisher, natural products chemist and botanical researcher in the area of entheogens and their cultural and historical uses, and helped coin the term "entheogen".

Writings
Ott has written eight books, co-written five, and contributed to four others, and published many articles in the field of entheogens. He has collaborated with other researchers like Christian Rätsch, Jochen Gartz, and the late ethnomycologist R. Gordon Wasson. He translated Albert Hofmann's 1979 book LSD: My Problem Child (LSD: Mein Sorgenkind), and On Aztec Botanical Names by Blas Pablo Reko, into English. His articles have appeared in many publications, including The Entheogen Review, The Entheogen Law Reporter, the Journal of Cognitive Liberties, the Journal of Psychoactive Drugs (AKA the Journal of Psychedelic Drugs), the MAPS Bulletin, Head, High Times, Curare, Eleusis, Integration, Lloydia, The Sacred Mushroom Seeker, and several Harvard Botanical Museum pamphlets. He is a co-editor of Eleusis: Journal of Psychoactive Plants & Compounds, along with Giorgio Samorini.

Botanical research
Ott has experience of field collecting in Mexico, where he lives and manages a small natural-products laboratory and botanical garden of medicinal herbs. A number of his ethno-botanical products have been studied to determine their possible benefits to individuals suffering various mental aberrations. In his book Ayahuasca Analogues, he identifies numerous plants around the globe containing the harmala alkaloids of Banisteriopsis caapi, which are MAOIs, and plants containing dimethyltryptamine, which together are the chemical base of the South American Ayahuasca brew.

Arson
In March 2010, Ott's home in Mexico was destroyed by arson. While most of his books survived the fire, Ott's laboratory and personal effects were destroyed in the blaze. Books given to Ott by Albert Hofmann were reportedly used as fuel.

Works

Books
 A Conscientious Guide to Hallucinogens: A Comprehensive Guide to Hallucinogens, Natural and Synthetic, Found in North American and the World with Joe E Axton and Jeremy Bigwood (1975) Do It Now Foundation, Institute for Chemical Survival
 Hallucinogenic Plants of North America (1976), 
 Teonanacatl: Hallucinogenic Mushrooms of North America (Co-edited by Jeremy Bigwood) (1978), 
 LSD: My Problem Child (1980) McGraw-Hill Book Company  (translation only)
 The Cacahuatl Eater: Ruminations of an Unabashed Chocolate Addict (Natural Products Company) (1985) 
 Persephone's Quest: Entheogens and the Origins of Religion with R. Gordon Wasson, Stella Kramrisch, and Carl A. P. Ruck (1986) 
 The Sacred Mushroom Seeker: Essays for R. Gordon Wasson by Robert Gordon Wasson, Thomas J. Riedlinger (1990) contributor
 Pharmacotheon: Entheogenic Drugs, Their Plant Sources and History (1993), 
 Ayahuasca Analogues: Pangaean Entheogens (1995), 
 Plant Intoxicants: a Classic Text on the Use of Mind-Altering Plants by Ernst Bibra and Jonathan Ott (1995) Nature
 Age of Entheogens & the Angels' Dictionary (1995), 
 Pharmacophilia: The Natural Paradise (1997), 
 Shamanic Snuffs or Entheogenic Errhines (2001), 
 Ometochtzin: Las Muertes de Dos Conejos (2001)
 Drugs of the Dreaming: Oneirogens: Salvia Divinorum and Other Dream-Enhancing Plants with Gianluca Toro and Benjamin Thomas (2007) Body, Mind & Spirit
 The Road to Eleusis (2008) By R. Gordon Wasson, Albert Hofmann, Carl A. P. Ruck, Huston Smith (contributor)

Articles
 Mr. Jonathan Ott's Rejoinder to Dr. Alexander H. Smith by Jonathan Ott and Alexander Hanchett Smith (1978) Botanical Museum of Harvard University
 Ethnopharmacognosy and Human Pharmacology of Salvia divinorum and Salvinorin A (1995)
 Pharmahuasca: On Phenethylamines and Potentiation (1996)
 Pharmahuasca, Anahuasca and Vinho da Jurema: Human Pharmacology of Oral DMT Plus Harmine (1997)
 The Delphic Bee: Bees and Toxic Honeys as Pointers to Psychoactive and Other Medicinal Plants - Economic Botany (1998)
 Applied Psychonautics: Ayahuasca to Pharmahuasca to Anahuasca (2001)
 Pharmanopo-Psychonautics: Human Intranasal, Sublingual, Intrarectal, Pulmonary and Oral Pharmacology of Bufotenine (2001)
 Jonathan Ott's victim of arson, signed copies of Albert Hofmann books used to start fire (2010)

See also
Richard E. Schultes
Ethnobotany
Psychedelic plants
Amanita Muscaria in pop-culture

References

 The Road to Eleusis (2008) By R. Gordon Wasson, Albert Hofmann, Carl A. P. Ruck, Huston Smith
 Psychedelics Encyclopedia by Peter G. Stafford, Jeremy Bigwood (1992) Page 379
 Researching Paganisms by Jenny Blain, Douglas Ezzy, Graham Harvey (2004) Page 87
 Brain Boosters: Food & Drugs That Make You Smarter by Beverly A. Potter, Sebastian Orfali, Potter & Orfali, Gini Graham Scott (1993) Health & Fitness - Page 191
 Yajé: The New Purgatory: Encounters with Ayahuasca by Jimmy Weiskopf (2005) Page 145
 Toads and Toadstools: the Natural History, Folklore, and Cultural Oddities of This Strange Association by Adrian Morgan (1995) Page 116

Video lecture
 Jonathan Ott at the World Psychedelic Forum [part 1 of 5]

External links
 Society of Ethnobotanical Studies and Modified States of Consciousness
Erowid Jonathan Ott vault
September 2001 interview with Ott in High Times magazine
Jonathan Ott - Psychedelic Pharmacopeia Lectures

1949 births
Living people
Writers from Hartford, Connecticut
American psychedelic drug advocates
Psychedelic drug researchers
Ethnobotanists
21st-century American botanists